The Bayard 1908 is a semi-automatic pistol that patented and designed by Belgian Bernard Clarus in 1907 as a short-range self-defense handgun. The Bayard 1908 was sold on the civilian market, chambered in .25 ACP, .32 ACP, and .380 ACP. The Belgian factory Anciens Etablissements Pieper produced it from 1908 until the late 1930s. Smith and Wesson engineers reintroduced the design of the Bayard 1908 in their Model 61 pistol, which ran in production from 1970-1973.

See also
List of pistols

Underbarrel pistols
FN M1900
GMC pistol
Jieffeco Model 1911
Semmerling XLM

References

Semi-automatic pistols 1901–1909
.25 ACP semi-automatic pistols
.32 ACP semi-automatic pistols
.380 ACP semi-automatic pistols